Events from the 1050s in England.

Incumbents
Monarch – Edward the Confessor

Events
 1050
 29 June – first Bishop of Exeter, Leofric, consecrated, uniting the former episcopal sees of Crediton and Cornwall.
 Sweyn Godwinson pardoned for murdering his cousin.
 1051
 Unknown part of the year – Heregeld is abolished by King Edward the Confessor of England. 
 29 June – the Norman bishop Robert of Jumièges is enthroned as Archbishop of Canterbury, having been appointed to the vacant seat by the king. He refuses to consecrate Spearhafoc as his successor as the Bishop of London, and William the Norman is appointed instead. Spearhafoc vanishes with the gold and jewels he had been given to make the royal crown and is never seen again.
 September – following a rebellion, King Edward the Confessor exiles Godwin, Earl of Wessex, to Flanders.
 1052
 Prince Gruffydd ap Llywelyn of Wales raids Herefordshire.
 14 September – Godwin, Earl of Wessex returns to England from exile. He sails a large fleet into London forcing King Edward to reinstate him.
 Three bishops appointed by King Edward – Robert of Jumièges; Ulfus Normanus, Bishop of Dorchester, and William the Norman, Bishop of London – flee the country.
 Stigand enthroned as Archbishop of Canterbury.
William, Duke of Normandy visits King Edward and may have been promised the throne after Edward's death.
 1053
 15 April – Godwin dies at Winchester and is succeeded by his son Harold Godwinson as Earl of Wessex.
 1054
 27 July – Siward, Earl of Northumbria, invades Scotland to support Malcolm Canmore against King Macbeth.
 1055
 Siward dies; Tostig Godwinson becomes Earl of Northumbria.
 24 October – Gruffydd ap Llywelyn and Ælfgar, exiled son of Leofric, Earl of Mercia, raid England, and sack Hereford.
 Harold Godwinson makes peace with Ælfgar, who returns from exile.
 1056
 17 June – Battle of Glasbury: Gruffydd ap Llywelyn raids England again, and kills Leofgar of Hereford. Gruffydd's forces burn down Hereford Cathedral.
 1057
 Edward the Exile, son of Edmund Ironside, returns to England, but dies shortly after.
 Leofric, Earl of Mercia dies, and his son Ælfgar is again exiled for treason.
 1058
 Aelfgar, supported by the Welsh and Norwegians, unsuccessfully attacks the English coast; he is nonetheless re-instated as Earl of Mercia.
 1059
Malcolm III of Scotland pays homage to King Edward.

Births
 1050
Waltheof II, Earl of Northumbria (died 1076)
 1051
Edgar Ætheling, uncrowned King of England (died c. 1126)

Deaths
 1050
 29 October – Edsige, Archbishop of Canterbury
 1051
 22 January – Aelfric Puttoc, archbishop of York
 1052
Emma of Normandy, consort of Ethelred the Unready and Canute the Great (born c. 985)
 1053
 15 April – Godwin, Earl of Wessex (born c. 1001)
 1055
Goda of England, princess (born 1004)
 1056
 10 February – Athelstan II, Bishop of Hereford
 16 June – Leofgar of Hereford, Bishop of Hereford
 1057
 February – Edward the Exile, son of Edmund II of England (born 1016)
 31 August – Leofric, Earl of Mercia (born 968)
 1058
Alfwold, Bishop of Sherborne

References